Reserve Township is one of thirteen townships in Parke County, Indiana, United States. As of the 2010 census, its population was 1,423 and it contained 675 housing units.

History
Reserve Township was so named on account of its territory once being part of an Indian reservation.

The Melcher Covered Bridge was listed on the National Register of Historic Places in 1978.

Geography

Cities, towns, villages
 Montezuma (vast majority)

Unincorporated towns
 Coloma at 
 Klondyke at 
 West Melcher at 
 West Union at 
(This list is based on USGS data and may include former settlements.)

Extinct towns
 Melcher at 
(These towns are listed as "historical" by the USGS.)

Cemeteries
The township contains these three cemeteries: Causey, Oakland and Warner.

Major highways
  U.S. Route 36

School districts
 Southwest Parke Community School Corporation

Political districts
 State House District 42
 State Senate District 38

References
 
 United States Census Bureau 2009 TIGER/Line Shapefiles
 IndianaMap

External links
 Indiana Township Association
 United Township Association of Indiana
 City-Data.com page for Reserve Township

Townships in Parke County, Indiana
Townships in Indiana